The 2022 Idemitsu Mazda MX-5 Cup presented by BF Goodrich was a single-make motor racing championship, the 18th season of the Mazda MX-5 Cup and the 2nd under a new sanctioning agreement with the International Motor Sports Association (IMSA). The series began on January 27 at Daytona International Speedway, and concluded on October 1 at Michelin Raceway Road Atlanta after 14 rounds. Jared Thomas won the driver's championship by a narrow margin of 10 points over Connor Zilisch, who was awarded Rookie of the Year. Hixon Motor Sports earned the entrant's championship.

Schedule
The schedule was announced on August 6, 2021, featuring 14 rounds across seven double-header weekends. All races are 45 minutes in length.

Entry list
All competitors utilize the Mazda MX-5 Cup car, modified to their homologated racing specification by Flis Performance.

 = Eligible for Rookie's Championship

Race Results 
Bold indicates overall winner.

Championship Standings

Points System 
Championship points are awarded at the finish of each event according to the chart below.

For each race, bonus points are awarded for the following:

 The ten (10) additional points for achieving pole position are not awarded if the starting grid is determined by “Other Means”.
 In the case of a tie for the most laps led, the competitor that finishes the highest in the running order is declared the winner.
 In the case of a tie for the fastest Race lap, the competitor that first achieves the fastest Race lap is declared the winner.

Driver's Championship 
IMSA recognizes driver champions based on the total number of championship points earned during the season.

‡: Race 1 at Mid-Ohio shortened due to weather, half points awarded except for pole position bonus points.

Entrant's Championship 
Each entrant receives championship points for its highest car finishing position in each race. The positions of subsequent finishing cars from the same entrant are not considered in the results and all other cars are elevated in the finishing positions accordingly.

‡: Race 1 at Mid-Ohio shortened due to weather, half points awarded except for pole position bonus points.

References

External links 
 Official Website

Mazda MX-5 Cup
Mazda MX-5 Cup